Meissen is a district (Kreis) in Saxony, Germany. It is bounded by (from the north and clockwise) the state of Brandenburg, the district of Bautzen, the urban district Dresden, the districts Sächsische Schweiz-Osterzgebirge, Mittelsachsen and Nordsachsen.

History
The district dates back to the Amt Meißen, which was first mentioned in 1334. The district was ruled by the Wettin dynasty.
The Margraves of what then became the Margravate of Meissen created the administrative division (Amt) in the 13th century. In 1835 the Amt was converted into an Amtshauptmannschaft, with the area of the current district covered by the Amtshauptmannschaften Meissen, Dresden and Großenhain. In 1939, these were renamed Landkreise (districts). In the administrative reform of 1952, several municipalities were transferred to the districts of Freiberg and Döbeln. In 1990, the old district borders were restored, and in 1996 parts of the district Dresden-Land were added. In August 2008 the district of Riesa-Großenhain was added to the district to give it its current size.

Geography
The main river of the district is the Elbe, which also flows through the town of Meissen.

Towns and municipalities

{|
! align=left width=33%|Towns
! align=left width=33%|Municipalities
|- valign=top
||
Coswig
Gröditz
Großenhain
Lommatzsch
Meissen
Nossen
Radebeul
Radeburg
Riesa
Strehla
||
Diera-Zehren
Ebersbach
Glaubitz
Hirschstein
Käbschütztal
Klipphausen
Lampertswalde
Moritzburg
Niederau
||
Nünchritz
Priestewitz
Röderaue
Schönfeld
Stauchitz
Thiendorf
Weinböhla
Wülknitz
Zeithain
|}

Politics 
Meißen (electoral district)

References

External links

Official website (German)
Unofficial website (German)